Acanthurus albipectoralis (whitefin surgeonfish) is a marine reef tang in the fish family Acanthuridae.

References

Acanthurus
Fish of Oceania
Fish described in 1987